Ipecac Loop was the music project of American composer Cameron Lewis. Under the moniker Ives released the album eX for Fifth Colvmn Records.

History
Ipecac Loop was founded in 1994 in New York City as a solo outlet for composer Cameron Lewis. Under his moniker, Lewis released his debut studio album eX on Fifth Colvmn Records in 1995. The compositions "Backbreaker" and "Clusterfuck" were released on the Forced Cranial Removal, Mind/Body Compilation Volume 2 and The Best of Mind/Body: Electro-Industrial Music From the Internet compilations by Fifth Colvmn and Atomic Novelties. Later "Backbreaker" and "Music Box" were later released on Mind/Body Compilation Volume 3 by Atomic Novelties and DIY Productions and Amduscias by Zenflesh, released respectively in 1996 and 1998. In 1996 Lewis released the new composition "Out From Under"  on the Fifth Colvmn compilation Echo. Ipecac Loop's debut was remastered and re-released by Forced Evolution Media in 1998.

Discography
Studio albums
 eX (1995, Fifth Colvmn)

Compilation appearances
 Forced Cranial Removal (1995 Fifth Colvmn)
 Mind/Body Compilation Volume 2 (1995, Atomic Novelties)
 The Best of Mind/Body: Electro-Industrial Music From the Internet (1996, Fifth Colvmn)
 Echo (1996, Full Contact)
 Mind/Body Compilation Volume 3 (1996, Atomic Novelties/DIY)
 Amduscias (1998, Zenflesh)

References

External links 
 
 Ipecac Loop at Bandcamp
 
 
 
 

Musical groups established in 1995
Musical groups established in 1998
1994 establishments in New York City
1998 establishments in New York City
American electronic musicians
American industrial musicians
American experimental musicians
Fifth Colvmn Records artists